Enrica Piccoli (born 19 January 1999) is an Italian synchronised swimmer. She competed in Team at the 2020 Summer Olympics.

She won a bronze medal in the team free routine competition at the 2018 European Aquatics Championships.

At the 2022 European Aquatics Championships, contested in Rome in August, Piccoli won a silver medal in the team technical routine on day one, helping achieve a final mark of 90.3772 points.

References

1999 births
Living people
Italian synchronized swimmers
World Aquatics Championships medalists in synchronised swimming
Artistic swimmers at the 2019 World Aquatics Championships
Artistic swimmers at the 2022 World Aquatics Championships
European Aquatics Championships medalists in synchronised swimming
European Games competitors for Italy
Synchronised swimmers at the 2015 European Games
People from Castelfranco Veneto
Synchronized swimmers at the 2020 Summer Olympics
Olympic synchronized swimmers of Italy
Sportspeople from the Province of Treviso